Adventureland is an indoor family entertainment center in the Sahara Centre shopping mall in Sharjah, United Arab Emirates.

References

External links

Amusement parks in the United Arab Emirates